The Lloyd–Bond House (also known as the Miller House) is a historic home in Lloyd, Florida. It is located on Bond Street. On November 1, 1984, it was added to the U.S. National Register of Historic Places.

References

Gallery

Houses on the National Register of Historic Places in Florida
National Register of Historic Places in Jefferson County, Florida
Houses in Jefferson County, Florida
Vernacular architecture in Florida
1864 establishments in Florida